James Stevenson may refer to:
James Stevenson (actor) (born 1981), American actor
James Stevenson (illustrator) (1929–2017), artist and author of children's books
James Stevenson (musician) (born 1958), English punk/alternative rock guitarist
James Stevenson (East India Company officer) (died 1805), British East India Company officer
James Stevenson, 1st Baron Stevenson (1873–1926), Member of House of Lords
James S. Stevenson (1780–1831), U.S. Representative from Pennsylvania
James Stevenson (geologist) (1840–1888), American geologist
James Croesus Stevenson (1822–1903), 19th century philanthropist and landowner on Vulcano
James Stevenson (Canadian politician) (1827–1910), Canadian MP
James Stevenson (cyclist) (1877–?), British Olympic cyclist
James Stevenson (Glasgow Camlachie MP) (1883–1963), judge and MP for Glasgow Camlachie, 1931–1935
James Stevenson (footballer, born 1872) (1872–1925), Scottish footballer (Dumbarton, Preston, West Bromwich) 
James Stevenson (footballer, born 1877), Scottish footballer (Clyde, Derby County, Newcastle, Bristol City) 
James Stevenson (footballer, born 1903), (1903–1973), Scottish footballer (Third Lanark, South Shields, Stockport County) 
James Cochran Stevenson (1825–1905), English industrialist and politician
James Stevenson (merchant) (1786–1864) Scottish merchant, Fellow of the Royal Society of Edinburgh, father to Flora Stevenson

See also
Jamie Stevenson (disambiguation)
James Stephenson (disambiguation)
Jim Stevenson (disambiguation)
J. J. Stevenson (geologist) (John James Stevenson, 1841–1924), American geologist, different from the one listed above
James Stevenson-Hamilton (1867–1957), first warden of South Africa's Sabi Nature Reserve